Doktor Dolitle is an album by Swedish folk singer-songwriter and guitar player Fred Åkerström.

1965 albums
Fred Åkerström albums
Swedish-language albums